Oliver Perry Beard (May 2, 1862 – May 28, 1929) was an American Major League Baseball player who played shortstop for the Cincinnati Red Stockings/Reds from 1889 to 1890. He then played third base for the Louisville Colonels in 1891.  Born in Lexington, Kentucky, it is claimed that his family invented the Kentucky version of the food, "Burgoo".  In his three-year career, he led the American Association in games played with 141 in 1889, and twice finished in the top five in the league in triples.  He finished his career with 331 games played, a .270 batting average, 195 runs scored, 34 doubles, 34 triples, and four home runs. He died at the age of 67 in Cincinnati, Ohio, and was cremated.

References

External links

1862 births
1929 deaths
19th-century baseball players
Major League Baseball shortstops
Major League Baseball third basemen
Cincinnati Red Stockings (AA) players
Cincinnati Reds players
Louisville Colonels players
Minor league baseball managers
Evansville (minor league baseball) players
Nashville Americans players
Acid Iron Earths players
Syracuse Stars (minor league baseball) players
Denver Mountaineers players
Spokane Bunchgrassers players
Macon Central City players
Macon Hornets players
Charleston Seagulls players
Kansas City Cowboys (minor league) players
Nashville Tigers players
Evansville Black Birds players
Rochester Blackbirds players
Detroit Tigers (Western League) players
Scranton Red Sox players
Baseball players from Lexington, Kentucky